{{safesubst:#invoke:RfD|||month = March
|day = 11
|year = 2023
|time = 08:30
|timestamp = 20230311083006

|content=
REDIRECT Kirk Thornton

}}